is an indoor arena located in Yokohama, Kanagawa Prefecture, Japan. The capacity of the arena is 17,000 and was opened in 1989. The arena was modeled after US sports venue Madison Square Garden in New York City. It is a five-minute walk from the closest station, Shin-Yokohama Station on the JR/Yokohama Municipal Subway.

As one of the largest concert venues in the Kantō region, it is a frequent location for artists to end their tours. The spacious stage allows for more complex set design and lighting, but the reasonable size makes it easier to sell out than the Tokyo Dome.

History

The Yokohama Arena was opened on April 1, 1989. At the exact day was held the opening celebration concert where performed renowned Japanese singer-songwriter Yumi Matsutoya, and the three upcoming days were additional dates of her concert tour. Many notable Japanese music acts performed at the arena, alphabetically: AKB48, Namie Amuro, Aqours, B'z, Babymetal, Buck-Tick, °C-ute, Gackt, The Gazette, Gen Hoshino, Glay, Ayumi Hamasaki, Hide, Hinatazaka46, Ikimono-gakari, L'Arc-en-Ciel, LiSA, Luna Sea, Misia, Nana Mizuki, NICO Touches the Walls, Momoiro Clover Z, Chisato Moritaka, Morning Musume, Mr. Children, Nogizaka46,  One Ok Rock, Ai Otsuka, Yutaka Ozaki, Scandal, Silent Siren, Southern All Stars, Hikaru Utada, X Japan, as well humanoid projection Hatsune Miku. International artists also performed there, like Guns N' Roses, JKT48, Mariah Carey, Paula Abdul, Whitney Houston, Bobby Brown , Steve Winwood, Frank Sinatra, Super Junior, Girls' Generation, Shinee, Big Bang, Beast/Highlight Kara, 2NE1, TVXQ, F.T. Island, CNBlue, Junho (2PM), f(x) (band), BTS, iKon, Seventeen, Exo-CBX, Twice and Red Velvet. The venue also held the annual Nano-Mugen Festival from 2005 until 2014, a rock festival organized by Asian Kung-Fu Generation.

Besides music events, there was held a martial arts competition, K-1 World Grand Prix Final in 2008.

2011 Tōhoku earthquake/tsunami relief
After the 2011 Tōhoku earthquake and resulting tsunami, Yokohama played host as an emergency shelter for those affected by the earthquake and tsunami. Citizens were allowed the stay the night, and were offered blankets and other amenities.
Hideharu Terada, a Yokohama Arena official stated "There has never been a big earthquake like this. [...] People are trickling in. They are all calm."

In popular culture 
Yokohama Arena is one of the venues featured in the manga and anime series Hajime no Ippo.

See also 
 List of indoor arenas in Japan

References

External links

Web Site

Basketball venues in Japan
Boxing venues in Japan
Music venues completed in 1989
Indoor arenas in Japan
Music venues in Japan
Sports venues completed in 1989
Sports venues in Yokohama
1989 establishments in Japan